Kurnool Cuddappah Canal popularly known as K.C. Canal is an irrigation canal located in Kurnool and Kadapa districts in Andhra Pradesh, India.

History
The K.C.Canal was constructed between 1863 and 1870 as an irrigation and navigation canal. This canal interconnects the rivers Penner and Tungabhadra. It starts from the Sunkesula barrage located on the Tungabhadra River near Kurnool.

The navigation system was abandoned during 1933 and the canal continued to be a major irrigation source. To improve the efficiency of the system, modernization of the entire canal and repairs/reconstruction of the structures is taken up under K.C. Canal modernization.  The project is under construction to stabilize entire ayacut of KC Canal and to develop the gap ayacut of 60,000 acres. The canal presently irrigates nearly 1,70,000 acres with 40 Tmcft (thousand million cubic feet) water utilisation from the Krishna River.

Assured water availability
Alternate water supply from  Srisailam reservoir is provided via Srisailam right main canal constructed under Telugu Ganga project. Also water can be pumped and fed to K.C. Canal from the recently commissioned Muchumarri lift or Handri-Neeva lift canal pump house from the Srisailam reservoir when its water level (up to 798 ft msl) is below the minimum drawdown level of Pothireddypadu head regulator which also feeds Telugu Ganga, Srisailam right bank canal and Galeru Nagari projects. Although there is assured water allocation of 10 tmcft for this project, most of the water meant for KC canal is drawn though the escape channel at banacherla cross regulator and taken to Somasila project for use by Nellore district depriving Rayalaseema of its allocated water. Very little water reaches the actual KC canal ayacut or the telugu ganga main canal ayacut which have very small capacity and are in disrepair.

See also
 Krishna Water Disputes Tribunal
 Rajolibanda Diversion Scheme
 Arthur Cotton

References

Canals in Andhra Pradesh
Buildings and structures in Kurnool district
Transport in Kurnool district
Buildings and structures in Kadapa district
Transport in Kadapa district
Canals opened in 1870
1870 establishments in India